= Just Say Goodbye (film) =

- Directed by: Matt Walting
- Written by: Layla O'Shea
- Produced by: Layla O'Shea; Matt Walting
- Starring: Katerina Eichenberger; Max MacKenzie; William Galatis; Pamela Jayne Morgan
- Cinematography: Jeff Simons
- Edited by: Matt Walting
- Production company: Walting Entertainment
- Distributed by: Leomark Studios
- Release dates: 25 October 2017 (NewFilmmakers New York Film Festival); 10 May 2019 (US)
- Running time: 106 minutes
- Country: United States
- Language: English

Just Say Goodbye is a 2017 American drama film directed by Matt Walting, starring Katerina Eichenberger, Max MacKenzie, William Galatis and Jesse Walters. Walting directed and produced the film while he was in high school.

== Cast ==
- Katerina Eichenberger as Sarah Morin
- Max MacKenzie as Jesse Peterson
- William Galatis as Rick Peterson
- Jesse Walters as Chase Gibbons

== Release ==
The film was released in the United States on 10 May 2019.

== Reception ==
Courtney Howard of Variety wrote that while the film contains many "preventable first-time-filmmaker mistakes", it also has "glimmers of potential" that "occasionally catch the light". Katie Walsh of the Los Angeles Times wrote that while the film's script "drags in parts and spends too much time rehashing the same issues", with a "bit of finesse", Walting could be a "promising new voice".

Jeffrey Anderson of Common Sense Media rated the film 3 stars out of 5 and called it "unpolished but heartfelt". Frank Schenk of The Hollywood Reporter wrote that while the film is "certainly affecting in spots", it "ultimately seems more like a well-intentioned PSA than organic drama."
